Euclemensia is a genus of moth in the family Cosmopterigidae.

Species
Euclemensia bassettella (Clemens, 1864)
Euclemensia barksdalensis Lee & Brown, 2011
Euclemensia caminopa (Meyrick, 1937)
Euclemensia schwarziella Busck, 1901
Euclemensia woodiella (Curtis, 1830)

Antequerinae
Moth genera